Tan Sri Dato' Seri Mohd Zuki bin Ali (Jawi: محمد ذوقي بن علي; born 11 August 1962) is a Malaysian civil servant who has served as Chief Secretary to the Government since January 2020.

Education 
An alumnus of National University of Malaysia (UKM) received his Bachelor of Economics in 1986 and a degree of Postgraduate Diploma in Public Management from the Malaysian National Institute of Public Administration (INTAN) in 1991. He then furthered his study at Nanyang Technological University (NTU), where he obtained a degree of Master of Business Administration (MBA) in 1999.

Career 
He joined the federal public service in December 1992 as an assistant secretary at the Ministry of Finance. He then served various posts at various ministries and agencies. He became Sarawak's secretary for federal affairs (a position of the civil service who is in charge ex officio of federal agencies in the East Malaysian states of Sabah and Sarawak) on 13 August 2016 and senior deputy secretary-general at the Prime Minister's Department on 1 August 2017. Prior to ascending to the top of Malaysian public service, he was transferred to the Ministry of Defence to serve as secretary-general on 18 April 2019.

Honours
  :
  Companion of the Order of Loyalty to the Royal Family of Malaysia (JSD) (2007)
  Commander of the Order of Loyalty to the Royal Family of Malaysia (PSD) – Datuk (2011)
  Commander of the Order of the Defender of the Realm (PMN) – Tan Sri (2020)
  :
  Grand Knight of the Order of Cura Si Manja Kini (SPCM) – Dato' Seri (2022)
  :
  Knight Grand Commander of the Order of the Crown of Selangor (SPMS) – Dato' Seri (2021)
  :
 Member of the Order of the Crown of Terengganu (AMT)
  Knight Grand Companion of the Order of Sultan Mizan Zainal Abidin of Terengganu (SSMZ) – Dato' Seri (2021)
  :
  Grand Commander of the Order of Kinabalu (SPDK) – Datuk Seri Panglima (2021)
  :
  Knight Commander of the Order of the Star of Hornbill Sarawak (DA) – Datuk Amar (2020)
  :
  Grand Commander of the Order of the Territorial Crown (SMW) – Datuk Seri (2018)
  :
  Knight Companion of the Order of the Crown of Pahang (DIMP) – Dato' (2008)
  :
  Recipient of the Distinguished Conduct Medal (PPT)

References

External links 
 Chief Secretary's website

1962 births 
Living people
Malaysian people of Malay descent
21st-century Malaysian people
20th-century Malaysian people
Malaysian Muslims
Nanyang Technological University alumni
National University of Malaysia alumni
Chief Secretaries to the Government of Malaysia
Commanders of the Order of the Defender of the Realm
Companions of the Order of Loyalty to the Royal Family of Malaysia
Commanders of the Order of Loyalty to the Royal Family of Malaysia
Grand Commanders of the Order of Kinabalu
Knights Grand Commander of the Order of the Crown of Selangor